Girolamo Codebò (died 1661) was a Roman Catholic prelate who served as Bishop of Reggio Emilia (1661)
and Bishop of Montalto delle Marche (1645–1661).

Biography
On 6 Feb 1645, Girolamo Codebò was appointed by Pope Innocent X as Bishop of Montalto delle Marche.
On 26 Mar 1645, he was consecrated bishop by Giovanni Battista Maria Pallotta, Cardinal-Priest of San Silvestro in Capite, with Alfonso Sacrati, Bishop Emeritus of Comacchio, and Ranuccio Scotti Douglas, Bishop of Borgo San Donnino, serving as co-consecrators. 
On 24 Jan 1661, he was transferred by Pope Alexander VII to the diocese of Reggio Emilia.

He served as Bishop of Reggio Emilia until his death on 3 Oct 1661.

While bishop, he was the principal co-consecrator of Francesco Antonio De Luca, Bishop of Anglona-Tursi (1654).

References

External links and additional sources
 (for Chronology of Bishops) 
 (for Chronology of Bishops) 
 (for Chronology of Bishops) 
 (for Chronology of Bishops) 

17th-century Italian Roman Catholic bishops
Bishops appointed by Pope Innocent X
Bishops appointed by Pope Alexander VII
1661 deaths